Clube de Futebol Os Belenenses is a professional Handball team based in Lisbon, Portugal. It plays in LPA, the most important league of Portugal.

Honours

Domestic competitions
Portuguese League: 5
1973–74, 1975–76, 1976–77, 1984–85, 1993–94
Portuguese Cup: 4
1973–74, 1977–78, 1981–82, 1983–84
Portuguese League Cup: 1
2005–06
Portuguese Super Cup: 1
1983

C.F. Os Belenenses
Portuguese handball clubs
1932 establishments in Portugal